Griselda is a feminine given name from Germanic sources that is now used in English, Italian, and Spanish as well. According to the 1990 United States Census, the name was 1066th in popularity among females in the United States.

It has been suggested that the name originated from Old English "gris hild", meaning "dark battle". 
The name likely specifically stems from the Proto-Germanic language elements *grīsaz, meaning both "grey" and "fearsome, terrible", and *haliþaz, meaning "warrior, hero", or alternately *hildiz, meaning "battle" (compare modern German grau and Held). 

As a figure in European folklore, Griselda is noted for her patience and obedience and has been depicted in works of art, literature and opera.

The name can also be spelled "Griselde", "Grisselda", "Grieselda", "Grizelda", "Gricelda", and "Criselda".

Common nicknames include "Zelda", "Selda", "Grissy", "Gris", "Grisel", "Grizel" or "Crisel"

People named Griselda include:
Griselda Álvarez (1913–2009), first female governor in Mexico
Griselda Blanco (1943-2012), a former drug lord for the Medellín Cartel
Griselda Gambaro (born 1928), Argentine writer
Griselda González (born 1965), Argentine former long-distance runner
Grizelda Kristiņa (1910–2013), last native speaker of the Livonian language
Griselda Pollock (born 1949), British art historian, cultural analyst and scholar
Griselda Tessio (born 1947), vice-governor of the Argentine province of Santa Fe

References

Italian feminine given names